is a Japanese model who is represented by the talent agency Stardust Promotion.

Filmography

TV series

Magazines

Advertisements

Radio series

Anime Film

References

External links
 Official profile 
  

Japanese female models
1990 births
Living people
Models from Niigata Prefecture
Models from Saitama Prefecture
Stardust Promotion artists
21st-century Japanese actresses